Tết Đoan Ngọ (Chữ Hán: 節端午), Tết Đoan Dương or Tết giết sâu bọ is the Vietnamese version of Chinese Duanwu festival (literally: Tết: festival, Đoan: the start/straight/middle/righteousness/just, Ngọ: at noon (from 11 am to 1 pm). Đoan Ngọ is the moment that the sun is the most near to the earth and this day often is "The middle day of summer" (Hạ chí). In Vietnam, this day is also the death anniversary of National Mother Âu Cơ. 

Compared to Cantonese Chinese term "dyun eng" (which is duan wu in Mandarin Chinese) ngo/eng/wu all refer to the ancient Chinese calendar term: the seventh of the twelve Earthly Branches, which was a component for determining time based on a series of 60 years (just as today we refer to 100 year periods as centuries).)  Ngo/eng/wu refers to the sun at noon.
 Tết Đoan Dương (Dương: yang) - yang being sun 
 Tết Trùng Ngũ (Trùng: double, Ngũ: the fifth), 
 Tết Đoan Ngũ, Tết Trùng Nhĩ or Tết Nửa Năm (Nửa Năm: a half of a year) is a festival celebrated at noon on the fifth day of the fifth lunar month. This day is the day around the time when the tail of the Great Bear points directly to the south, that is, around the time of the summer solstice. At this time, the universe brings the greatest amount of yang or maleness in the entire year. Therefore, creatures and people must become stronger in both their health and their souls to overcome this.

Traditions
Cơm rượu, a sticky rice dessert, is traditionally eaten on this holiday. Bánh tro, a kind of bánh lá, is used during this holiday with hard-boiled eggs. Bánh tro is considered "cool", and symbolized yin because it includes vegetable ash water as an ingredient. Bánh tro is a perfect match with extreme hot day like May 5 in the lunar year. According to tradition, on the morning of the Tết Đoan ngọ, when people wake up, they often eat fruit and rượu nếp to kill insects and diseases in people.

Modern festival 

On the occasion of Tết Đoan Ngọ, there is Festival of Delicious Fruit celebrated in Chợ Lách, Bến Tre Province with activities: fruit competition, fruit arrangement competition and fruit crop competition. 
At this time, there is also Festival of Southern Fruit celebrated in Suối Tiên amusement park, Ho Chi Minh city.

See also
Dano (Korean festival)
Duanwu Festival
Kodomo no hi

References

Festivals in Vietnam

vi:Tết Đoan Ngọ